Lamb Holm is a small uninhabited island in Orkney, Scotland. The Italian Chapel, constructed during the Second World War, is the island's main attraction.

Lamb Holm is classified by the National Records of Scotland as an uninhabited island that "had no usual residents at the time of either the 2001 or 2011 censuses."

Geography

The Churchill Barriers carry the road from South Ronaldsay to Mainland, Orkney. Lamb Holm is connected to Glimps Holm, to the southwest, by Barrier number 2, and to Mainland by Barrier number 1.

The quarry used to build the Churchill Barriers has now been flooded and converted into a fish farm.

On the northwest of the island, on the shore of St Mary's Bay, are the remains of a prehistoric settlement which have been designated as a scheduled monument.

There is a Bronze age Barrow mound on the island named as "Laughton's Knowe". The name may have evolved from an earlier form "Lachtane" or "Lauchtain" associated with Orkney but prior to the family of this name settling on the island following the impignoration in 1472 resulting in an influx of Scottish Tacksmen loyal to the Stewart King of Scots, it is likely to have had either no name at all or an entirely different reference.

Italian Chapel

Built by Italian prisoners of war during World War II, the highly ornamented Italian Chapel is now the island's main attraction. The chapel is a Category A listed building.

In 1942, more than 1300 Italian prisoners of war were captured in North Africa and taken to Orkney, where they remained until early 1945. Of these, 550 were taken to Camp 60, where they were put to work building the Churchill Barriers, four causeways created to block unwanted extra sea accesses to Scapa Flow.

In 1943, Major T. P. Buckland, Camp 60's new commandant, and Father Giacombazzi, the Camp's priest agreed that a place of worship was required. Two Nissen huts were joined together to form a makeshift chapel. The prisoners, under the leadership of prisoner Domenico Chiocchetti, did all of the work to transform a simple corrugated iron structure into a work of beauty. The chapel was lined with plasterwork and an altar was made out of concrete. Chiocchetti painted the sanctuary end of the chapel. The beauty that he created led to the prisoners decorating the entire interior and creating a front façade out of concrete that concealed the shape of the hut and made the building look like a church.

Since the prisoners' departure, several residents of Camp 60, including Chiocchetti, have made return visits to the chapel they created. In 1996 a declaration was jointly signed by officials in Orkney and Chiocchetti's hometown of Moena, reinforcing the ties between the two places. The building has been preserved and is still used as a chapel.

Gallery

See also

 List of islands of Scotland

Footnotes

Uninhabited islands of Orkney
World War II prisoner of war camps in Scotland